No Place to Hide is a 1948 book by American writer David J. Bradley published by Little, Brown and Company. The book is a Harvard Medical School graduate's autobiographical tale of his work in the Radiological Safety Section in the Pacific in the aftermath of the Bikini atomic bomb tests, Operation Crossroads. The book alerted the world to the dangers of radioactive fallout from nuclear weapon explosions. The book was marketed for Bantam by Judith Merril, who found Bradley's prose "a man's book with little appeal for women", leading her to later write her own nuclear war story Shadow on the Hearth from the homemaker's perspective. Bradley toured lecturing on the dangers of fallout, including a 1950 lecture at Ford Hall Forum.

The book was reissued with an epilogue in 1984.

References

1948 non-fiction books
Books about nuclear issues